Norton's dome is a thought experiment that exhibits a non-deterministic system within the bounds of Newtonian mechanics. It was devised by John D. Norton in 2003. It is a special limiting case of a more general class of examples from 1997 due to Sanjay Bhat and Dennis Bernstein. The Norton's dome problem can be regarded as a problem in physics, mathematics, or philosophy.

Description 
The model consists of an idealized particle initially sitting motionless at the apex of an idealized radially symmetrical frictionless dome described by the equation

where h is the vertical displacement from the top of the dome to a point on the dome, r is the geodesic distance from the dome's apex to that point (in other words, a radial coordinate r is "inscribed" on the surface), g is acceleration due to gravity and b is a proportionality constant.

Solutions to the equations of motion

Norton shows that there are two classes of mathematical solutions to this equation. In the first, the particle stays sitting at the apex of the dome forever. In the second, the particle sits at the apex of the dome for a while, and then after an arbitrary period of time starts to slide down the dome in an arbitrary direction. The apparent paradox in this second case is that this would seem to occur for no discernible reason, and without any radial force being exerted on it by any other entity, apparently contrary to both physical intuition and normal intuitive concepts of cause and effect, yet the motion is still entirely consistent with the mathematics of Newton's laws of motion.

To see that all these equations of motion are physically possible solutions, it's helpful to use the time reversibility of Newtonian mechanics. It is possible to roll a ball up the dome in such a way that it reaches the apex in finite time and with zero energy, and stops there. By time-reversal, it is a valid solution for the ball to rest at the top for a while and then roll down in any one direction. However, the same argument applied to the usual kinds of domes (e.g., a hemisphere) fails, because a ball launched with just the right energy to reach the top and stay there would actually take infinite time to do so.

Resolutions to the paradox 

While many criticisms have been made of Norton's thought experiment, such as it being a violation of the principle of Lipschitz continuity (the force that appears in Newton's second law is not a Lipschitz continuous function of the particle's trajectory -- this allows evasion of the local uniqueness theorem for solutions of ordinary differential equations), or in violation of the principles of physical symmetry, or that it is somehow in some other way "unphysical", there is no consensus among its critics as to why they regard it as invalid.

Indeterminate derivatives 

A simple criticism of the thought experiment is as follows, however:

The entire argument hinges on the behavior of the particle at the point , during a time period where it has zero velocity.  Traditional Newtonian mechanics would say that the position of the particle would, infinitesimally be

 ,

for some small time , but because the second derivative of the surface does not exist at this point, the force is indeterminate.  It's therefore completely sensible that the infinitesimal motion of the object is also indeterminate.

See also 
 Indeterminism
 Spontaneous symmetry breaking

References

External links 
 John Norton's webpage for the Norton dome problem

Classical mechanics
Physical paradoxes
Thought experiments
Determinism
Thought experiments in physics